The 1983 Dwars door België was the 38th edition of the Dwars door Vlaanderen cycle race and was held on 24 March 1983. The race started and finished in Waregem. The race was won by Etienne De Wilde.

Gerrie Knetemann hit a parked car during the race, and was sent to hospital with serious injuries, that took him out of race for a good part of the rest of the season.

General classification

References

1983
1983 in road cycling
1983 in Belgian sport
March 1983 sports events in Europe